G. Delbert Morris (June 23, 1909 – November 4, 1987) was a United States Republican politician who served in the California State Assembly for the 63rd district from 1947 to 1956.

Morris was born in Nogales, Arizona. During World War II he served in the United States Navy.  He was elected to the California State Assembly in 1948, and remained a member until his resignation in 1956, after having been found guilty of perjury concerning the sale of state liquor licenses. He was sentenced to two years in prison.

He was succeeded by two daughters and his wife. He also served in the US Navy during World War Two. He was aboard the USS Lexington in WWII when it sank, but survived.

References

External links
 

United States Navy personnel of World War II
Members of the California State Assembly
1909 births
1987 deaths
20th-century American politicians
People from Nogales, Arizona
Shipwreck survivors
California politicians convicted of crimes